Kakunio is a settlement in Kenya's Eastern Province. Kakunio has an elevation of 818 metres. Kakunio is situated nearby to Kyoani, and southwest of Kitoo.

Kakunio's estimated terrain elevation above sea level is 826 metres.

References 

Populated places in Eastern Province (Kenya)